BK Ogre is a professional basketball club based in Ogre, Latvia playing in the Latvian Basketball League and Latvian-Estonian Basketball League. The professional club was founded in 2014, but until then there was a local team that played second tier basketball. Ogre has a long history of bringing up professional players like Kaspars Bērziņš, Artūrs Bērziņš, Rinalds Sirsniņš among many others.

History 
City of Ogre has a long history of bringing up professional basketball players, including Kaspars Bērziņš, Artūrs Bērziņš and Rinalds Sirsniņš who have all once played for Latvia national basketball team. In 2009 local sports school's team started to play in Latvian 2nd division. After going to semi-finals in debut season management was assured of going to right direction with participation in 2nd division.

As Latvian Basketball League was looking for new teams to join the league, Ogre first started to think of going fully professional in 2014. City of Ogre established a professional club with a goal to win the 2nd division. After winning 2nd division in 2015, management decided it's time to move to the next level and joined the Latvian Basketball League.

During the first season club got new title sponsor and changed its name to Ogre/Kumho Tyre. After finishing the debut season next to last team let go head coach Edgars Teteris and hired Latvian U16 head coach Artūrs Visockis-Rubenis, who previously worked for University of Latvia. In 2016/2017 Ogre/Kumho Tyre made a debut in Baltic Basketball League. Also, during the season the most famous Ogre's player Kaspars Bērziņš joined the team  for couple months to get back in shape after an injury and wait for bigger offers.

Players

Current roster

Depth chart

Season by season

Honours

League
Latvian League: 
Winners (0): 
Runners-up (1): 2020
Bronze (3): 2019, 2021, 2022
Latvian League 2nd Division:
Winners (1): 2015
Latvian–Estonian League
Winners (0): 
Runners-up (0):
Bronze (1): 2021

Coaches

 Pēteris Ozoliņš: 2014-2015 
 Edgars Teteris: 2015-2016 
 Artūrs Visockis-Rubenis: 2016-2019 
 Nikolajs Mazurs: 2019-2021 
 Uldis Švēde: 2021-

References

External links
  

Ogre, Latvia
Ogre
Basketball teams established in 2014